Rudat al-Tar ( rūḍat aṭ-ṭār)  is a Syrian village located in Al-Suqaylabiyah Nahiyah in Al-Suqaylabiyah District, Hama.  According to the Syria Central Bureau of Statistics (CBS), the village had a population of 744 in the 2004 census.

References 

Populated places in al-Suqaylabiyah District